Elwood F. "Ed" Holton III is the Jones S. Davis Distinguished Professor of Human Resource, Leadership, and Organization Development in the School of Human Resource Education and Workforce Development at Louisiana State University where he coordinates their B.S., M.S., and Ph.D. degree programs in Human Resource and Leadership Development.

He also serves as Special Assistant to the Chancellor for Workforce Development and is leading efforts to create a Center for Workforce Studies at LSU. In 2004, he was inducted into the International Adult and Continuing Education Hall of Fame in recognition of his career-long contributions to the field. In 2002, he was named the Outstanding Human Rights Development Scholar by the Academy of Human Resource Development (AHRD).

Research fields
His research focuses on workforce development policy, analysis and evaluation of organizational learning and performance systems, improving learning transfer systems, management and leadership development, and HRD policy and strategy. He is a Past-President of the Academy of Human Resource Development (AHRD) and one of 75 charter members of that organization. In total, he served 7 years on the organization’s Board of Directors.

Awards

His research has won numerous awards, including the Richard A. Swanson Research Excellence Award from the Academy of Human Resource Development and six Citations of Excellence from ANBAR Management Intelligence. He teaches many different courses including Fundamentals of Human Resource Development, Principles of Adult Education, Needs Assessment in Training and Development, Advanced
Training Design and Methods, HRD Evaluation, Leadership in Organizations, Consulting in Organizations, Advanced HRD Theory, Managing Change in Organizational Systems and Leadership Development Strategies.

Books and articles
He is the author or editor of 19 books including: co-editor of Improving Learning Transfer Systems in Organizations (Jossey- Bass, 2003); co-author of Approaches to Training and Development (Perseus Publishing, 2003); co-author of Human Resource Development: Foundations of Theory and Practice (Berrett-Koehler, 2001); co-author of How to Succeed in Your First Job: Tips for New College Graduates, So You Are New Again: How to Succeed When You Change Jobs, and Helping Your New Employee Succeed: Tips for Managers of New College Graduates (Berrett-Koehler, 2001); co-author of The Adult Learner-5th ed. (Gulf Publishing, 1998); co-author of Results: How to Assess Performance, Learning, and Perceptions in Organizations (Berrett- Koehler, 1999) that was the main selection of the Executive Program Book Club; author of The Ultimate New Employee Survival Guide. (Petersons, 1998); co-editor of the HRD Research Handbook (Berrett-Koehler, 1997); editor of the case book Leading Change in Organizations (ASTD, 1997); and co-editor of Conducting Needs Assessment (ASTD, 1995).

He is an author of over 200 publications including academic and professional articles in journals such as Advances in Developing
Human Resources, Human Resource Development Quarterly, Human Resource Development International, Performance Improvement Quarterly, Human Resource Management Review, Human Resource Planning, Human Performance, International Journal of Training and Development,
Journal of European Industrial Training, Public Personnel Management, Journal of Organizational and Occupational Psychology, Training and Development, and the Journal of Business and Psychology. In addition, he is the founding editor of Human Resource Development Review, a quarterly refereed journal devoted to theory and theory building in human resource development and related fields. He has also served on the editorial boards of HRD Quarterly, Human Resource Development International, Advances in Developing Human Resources and a reviewer for Performance Improvement Quarterly, Personnel Psychology, Human Performance, Human Relations, International Journal of Manpower and the International Journal of Training and Development.

References

External links
 Learning Transfer Solutions Global
 Learning Transfer Guru
 YouTube tutorials on Transfer of Training

Living people
Louisiana State University faculty
Year of birth missing (living people)
Virginia Tech alumni